Naked Angel is a 2011 independent film written and directed by Christina Morales Hemenway. Starring James Duval and introducing Cameron Watkins, the film revolves around Andreas, played by Duval who wants to let go of life and falls in love with an angel who longs to be human and is inspired to live again.

Cast
 James Duval as Andreas
 Cameron Watkins as Estelle
 Debra Wilson as Mama Tony
 Kelly Perine as Homeless Musician
 Johnny Moreno as Joe
 Linda Chapman as Camille
 Julian Sapala as Laz
 Andy Wolf as Priest
Ashley Goulson as Laria

Production
Director Christina Morales Hemenway had the following to say about the film:

References

External links
 

American romantic drama films
2011 romantic drama films

2010s English-language films

2010s American films